Stepien or Stępień may refer to:

Places
Stępień, Warmian-Masurian Voivodeship, a village in Poland
Stępień, West Pomeranian Voivodeship, a village in Poland

People
 Andrzej Stępień (born 1953), Polish Olympic athlete
 Bill Stepien (born 1978), American political consultant
 Karol Herman Stępień (1910–1943), Polish Roman Catholic martyr
 Marek Stępień (born 1964), Polish fencer
 Mariusz Stepien (born 1976), metal detector enthusiast in Scotland
 Piotr Stępień (born 1963), Polish wrestler
 Ted Stepien (1925–2007), American sports team owner
 Władysław Stępień (born 1946), Polish politician
 Włodzimierz Stępień (born 1952), Polish politician

See also
 
 Septién, a surname